Babette Bensoussan is an author and competitive intelligence specialist, who has written several books on competitive intelligence and analysis. She runs a consulting firm based in Sydney, Australia, The MindShifts Group Pty. Ltd.  Babette now lives with her husband on the Sunshine Coast in Queensland, Australia.

Career
Bensoussan was a founder and vice-president for the Society of Competitive Intelligence Professionals (SCIP) in Australia, a member of the Journal of Competitive Intelligence and Management and Competitive Intelligence Review editorial boards.  She has taught undergraduate, MBA and executive courses on competitive analysis and intelligence at the Sydney Graduate School of Management and Bond University. Her work has also focused on business model analysis, competitive positioning analysis, four corners analysis, and shadowing.

Works

 2008 Analysis without Paralysis, with Craig Fleisher (FT Press)
 2007 Business and Competitive Analysis: Effective Application of New and Classic Methods, with Craig Fleisher (FT Press)
 2007 Staying Ahead of the Competition: How Firms Really Manage Their Competitive Intelligence and Knowledge—Evidence from a Decade of Rapid Change, with C. Hall (World Scientific)
 2003 Strategic and Competitive Analysis: Methods and Techniques for Analyzing Business Competition, with Craig Fleisher (Prentice Hall)

Awards
1996 SCIP Fellows Award
2006 MGSM Alumni Award
2006 SCIP Meritorious Award

References

External links
 

Academic staff of Bond University
Australian non-fiction writers
Year of birth missing (living people)
Living people
Australian people of Moroccan-Jewish descent
Jewish Australian writers
20th-century Moroccan Jews
University of Technology Sydney alumni